Self-Portrait is the debut extended play by South Korean singer Suho. It was released on March 30, 2020, by SM Entertainment. The physical edition was released in two versions, Archive #1 and Archive #2, while the digital version shares the cover of the latter, a collage of four impressionist paintings of Suho's face. The EP features six tracks including the lead single, "Let's Love".

Background and release
On February 18, 2020, SM Entertainment announced that Suho was preparing for his solo debut. On February 27 it was reported that the singer had already completed recording the album. The release date was later announced along with the first promotional photo for the album.

The album and its title track's music video were released on March 30 at 6PM KST both digitally and physically.

Composition
Self-Portrait features six tracks of different pop and rock genres. The lead single "Let's Love" is described as a modern rock song with a warm atmosphere. The lyrics convey a message about mustering the courage to express love, even if you feel clumsy or inadequate.

"O2" is a dreamlike acoustic pop song. The lyrics are about two people with empty hearts who become each other's oxygen as they fall in love. The third song "Made in You" is a mid-tempo pop song that features a groovy drum beat and piano melody. The song is dedicated to Suho's fans, and the lyrics are about how he feels he wouldn't have made it this far or be who he is without them. "Starry Night" is described as a ballad rock song that serves as a continuation of the story present in Suho's first solo song, "Curtain" (2017). The lyrics express the pain of parting with a lover. "Self-Portrait" is a sentimental modern rock song with retro synthesizers and strings. The last song "For You Now" is an acoustic pop song with a piano-driven melody. It presents lyrics conveying sincere gratitude and comfort from one person to another. The song features singer Younha.

Suho participated in writing and conceptualizing each song on the EP, and every track represents a piece of the album's connecting storyline.

Commercial performance
The EP peaked at number 13 on the US World Albums chart. Additionally, Self-Portrait topped over 50 countries' iTunes charts. The EP was certified Platinum for selling over 55,000 copies on China's biggest music platform, QQ Music.

Track listing

Charts

Weekly charts

Monthly charts

Sales

Certifications

Release history

See also
 List of Gaon Album Chart number ones of 2020

References

2020 debut EPs
SM Entertainment EPs
Korean-language EPs
IRiver EPs
Suho albums